Shurabad-e Mehrab Khan (also Romanized as Shūrābād-e Mehrāb Khān; also known as Shūrābād) is a village in Fahraj Rural District, in the Central District of Fahraj County, Kerman Province, Iran. At the 2006 census, its population was 54, in 9 families.

References 

Populated places in Fahraj County